KYCW-LD (channel 24) is a low-power television station licensed to Branson, Missouri, United States, serving the Springfield area as an affiliate of The CW. It is owned by Gray Television alongside NBC affiliate KYTV (channel 3) and ABC affiliate KSPR-LD (channel 33); it is also sister to Branson-licensed tourist information–formatted station K17DL-D, channel 17 (which is owned by Branson Visitors TV, LLC, a joint venture between Gray [50.1%] and Market Branson, LLC [49.9%]). KYCW-LD, KYTV and KSPR-LD share studios on West Sunshine Street in Springfield, while KYCW-LD's transmitter is located on Highway FF north of Fordland.

KYCW-LD's low-power broadcasting radius does not reach the entire market. Therefore, it is simulcast in 16:9 widescreen standard definition on KYTV's third digital subchannel (33.2), and in high definition on KSPR-LD's second digital subchannel (also mapped to virtual channel 24.1); it is also simulcast to Branson on K17DL's digital subchannel (24.2).

Programming
Syndicated programs broadcast by KYCW-LD include Family Guy, Castle, and The Big Bang Theory.

Subchannels
The station's digital signal is multiplexed:

References

External links

The CW affiliates
MeTV affiliates
Cozi TV affiliates
WeatherNation TV affiliates
Gray Television
YCW-LD
Low-power television stations in the United States
Television channels and stations established in 1986
1986 establishments in Missouri
Branson, Missouri